Alan Catello Grazioso is an American non-fiction filmmaker, multimedia expert, and online content producer. Grazioso created original content for three PBS Kids television series including Zoom, Fetch! with Ruff Ruffman and Postcards from Buster, the last of which he was nominated for a 2008 Daytime Emmy Award for Outstanding Children Series. Grazioso's online video credits include "Lives on the Line: The Human Cost of Chicken", a web-based interactive project funded and published by Oxfam America which received a 2016 Webby Award Honoree achievement. In 2016, The Washington Post ran a two-minute online short film produced by Grazioso for Oxfam's "Lives on the Line" campaign and current affairs website AJ+ ran a separate social media targeted version.

Grazioso graduated from Northeastern University in Boston. In 2017, he oversaw production of a series of video assets for Harvard Business Publishing (HBP) ManageMentor, a subscriber-based online learning platform for global Fortune 500 companies. Grazioso was staff member of Harvard Business School (HBS), overseeing production for HBS MBA and executive education programs. While at HBS, Grazioso was responsible for the creation of curriculum-focused content and overseas on-location production internationally and domestically in close partnership with HBS faculty. Grazioso also conceived of the podcast series "HBS Staff Stories" in collaboration with the leadership and content teams in the HBS Dean's Office and Marketing and Communications Department.  Grazioso currently is the senior manager of multimedia on the Communications team at Harvard Radcliffe Institute (HRI), which is part of Harvard University. In April 2022, the HRI Communications group spearheaded the digital launch of the Harvard & Legacy of Slavery website, which was anchored at Harvard Radcliffe Institute and included a report, film, articles, and a mobile-based app tour.  Grazioso served as the executive producer of the mobile-based tour.

Background
Grazioso grew up in New Haven, Connecticut. His father, Cal Grazioso, was a union crane operator with Local 478 in Connecticut. His mother, Dee Grazioso, worked as an administrator for the Yale School of Medicine for over 25 years. He attended Notre Dame High School where he played varsity baseball, served as class treasurer and yearbook photographer before graduating in 1987. During Grazioso's sophomore year at Northeastern University, he took a full-time six-month "co-op" position at NPR in Washington, DC.

His other credits include video editor of the video companion of a 2008 Thompson Learning textbook, as well as producer of the "Resources for Early Learners" public online site created by the WGBH Educational Foundation.

Awards and nominations
 (Won) Telly Award (Silver), 2021 – (Harvard Business School) Peak Investment Capital: Changing the Narrative of West Africa
(Won) Webby Award Honoree, 2016 – Lives on the Line: The Human Cost of Chicken – Oxfam America
 (Won) Hatch Award, 2011 – Mass Mentoring "Shawn & Quantel"
 (Nominated) Daytime Emmy Award, 2009 – Fetch! with Ruff Ruffman – PBS Kids
 (Nominated) Daytime Emmy Award, 2008 – Postcards from Buster – PBS Kids
 (Won) Parents' Choice Award, 2008 – Postcards from Buster – PBS Kids
 (Won) Daytime Emmy Award, 2006 – ZOOM – PBS Kids
 (Nominated) Daytime Emmy Award, 2005 – ZOOM – PBS Kids
 (Nominated) Daytime Emmy Award, 2004 – ZOOM – PBS Kids
 (Nominated) Daytime Emmy Award, 2003 – ZOOM – PBS Kids

Selected filmography

Producer
 Postcards from Buster – PBS Kids
 Fetch with Ruff Ruffman – PBS Kids
 ZOOM – PBS Kids
 What's Your 20? – Travel Channel (pilot)
 Reunite Road Trip – Travel Channel (pilot)

References 

American documentary film producers
Businesspeople from New Haven, Connecticut
Year of birth missing (living people)
Living people
Film producers from Connecticut